The Aeolians were one of the four major tribes in which Greeks divided themselves in the ancient period (along with the Achaeans, Dorians and Ionians).

Name
Their name mythologically derives from Aeolus, the mythical ancestor of the Aeolians and son of Hellen, the mythical patriarch of the Greek nation; it actually comes from Greek term aiolos (αίολος) meaning "quickly moving". The dialect of ancient Greek they spoke is referred to as Aeolic.

History
Originating in Thessaly, a part of which was called Aeolis, the Aeolians often appear as the most numerous amongst the other Hellenic tribes of early times. The Boeotians, a subgroup of the Aeolians, were driven from Thessaly by the Thessalians and moved their location to Boeotia. Aeolian peoples were spread in many other parts of Greece such as Aetolia, Locris, Corinth, Elis and Messinia. During the Dorian invasion, Aeolians from Thessaly fled across the Aegean Sea to the island of Lesbos and the region of Aeolis, called as such after them, in Asia Minor.

Early record
According to Herodotus, it was said that the Aeolians were previously called Pelasgians.

See also
Aeolian (disambiguation)
Aeolic Greek
Aeolis

References

Citations

Sources

 
Greek tribes
Ancient tribes in Greece
Ancient tribes in Thessaly
Ancient tribes in Boeotia
Ancient peoples of Anatolia